İstanbul Professional League was a Turkish football league that operated in İstanbul, Turkey. 

The league formed after professional football in the country began in 1952. There were initially 10 teams. It was also known as Istanbul Professional League 1, after İstanbul Professional League 2 was formed in the 1956-57 season. The team who finished the İstanbul Professional League 2 in second place was promoted to PL1, while the PL1 team who finished in last place moved to PL2. İstanbul Professional League was later replaced by İstanbul Local League.

Football leagues in Turkey
Sports competitions in Istanbul